Jessica Kuster (born 20 August 1992) is an American professional basketball player.

College
Kuster played college basketball at Rice University in Houston, Texas for the Owls.

Statistics 

|-
|2010–11 
| align="left" |Rice
|32
|–
|29.0
|.459
|.352
|.737
|10.6
|0.9
|0.9
|2.0
|2.1
|14.0
|-
|2011–12
| align="left" |Rice
|30
|–
|32.0
|.430
|.281
|.716
|11.1
|0.9
|1.9
|1.6
|2.7
|17.3
|-
|2012–13
| align="left"|Rice
|30
|–
|34.0
|.402
|.228
|.766
|10.0
|2.5
|0.9
|1.4
|2.8
|16.1
|-
|2013–14
| align="left"|Rice
|30
|–
|37.0
|.434
|.339
|.810
|13.3
|2.5
|1.6
|1.4
|3.1
|20.9
|-
|Career
|
|122
|–
|25.1
|.430
|.299
|.757
|11.2
|1.7
|1.3
|1.6
|2.7
|17.0

Career

College career 
The Rice all-time leading scorer (women or men) with 2,081 points... C-USA and Rice all-time leader in career double-doubles (67) ... C-USA and Rice all-time leader in rebounds (1,376) .... Only player in C-USA history to be named to both the First-Team All-Conference and the All-Defensive Team all four seasons ... One of just 145 players in NCAA Div. I history to record over 2,000 career points and 1,000 career rebounds ... Joined Middle Tennessee's Ebony Rowe as the only players to have averaged a double double in each of their four seasons ... Became the quickest Rice player to reach 1,000 career points (two seasons and two games), the eighth to reach the milestone as the junior and the 18th Rice player overall to reach 1,000 points ... Rice record holder for career field goals made (745) and career made free throws (550).

WNBA 
After going undrafted in 2014, Kuster was then signed by the San Antonio Stars to a training camp contract. Kuster was waived before the beginning of the season.

In 2015, Kuster was signed as a free-agent to the Tulsa Shock training camp roster. Kuster was waived in June during the final cuts ahead of the season.

Europe
In 2014, Kuster travelled to Europe to begin her professional career, signing with CSU Alba Iulia in the Liga Națională in Romania. In 2015, Kuster would remain in Europe, signing with Basketball Nymburk in the Czech National League. In her 2015–16 season with Nymburk, Kuster was both a Czech Cup champion and MVP. She was also named to the all import team. In her third professional year, Kuster signed with PEAC-Pécs in Hungary's Nemzeti Bajnokság I/A for 2016–17. In 2017, Kuster would debut in the Italian league, Serie A1, after signing with Ragusa. She would play two seasons with Ragusa and was an Italian Cup in her second season with the club.

WNBL
In May 2019, Kuster was signed by the Sydney Uni Flames in Australia's WNBL for the 2019–20 season. After a successful debut season in Australia, Kuster then announced that she would retire from basketball to pursue full-time ministry.

References

1992 births
Living people
American women's basketball players
Forwards (basketball)
Rice Owls women's basketball players
Sydney Uni Flames players
American expatriate sportspeople in Australia